Gordon Zahn (born Gordon Charles Paul Roach; August 7, 1918, in Milwaukee, Wisconsin – December 9, 2007, in Wauwatosa, Wisconsin) was an American sociologist, pacifist, professor, and author.

Early life 

Born out of wedlock, Zahn took his stepfather's last name. During World War II, he was a conscientious objector, and served in a Civilian Public Service camp established by the Catholic Worker Movement. Zahn later transferred to Rosewood State Training School in Maryland, a school for the developmentally disabled. He worked there as a conscientious objector until April 1946. His experiences at Rosewood were published in the Catholic Worker in the July and October 1946 issues, as a continuation of his attempt to reform Rosewood.

Education and career 
In 1946 Zahn and a friend went to Saint John's University in Collegeville, Minnesota. There they met Eugene McCarthy, who hired them when he became a U.S. Senator. Zahn received a PhD from The Catholic University of America and then a job at Loyola University Chicago. Cardinal Augustin Bea unsuccessfully pressured both Loyola and a German publisher to stop Zahn's book German Catholics and Hitler's Wars. Zahn was later hired away by the University of Massachusetts Amherst.

Second Vatican Council 
Zahn was important in the debate over warfare in the Second Vatican Council, specifically Schema 13. Through Richard Carbray and archbishop Thomas Roberts, Zahn was introduced to Abbot Christopher Butler. Zahn gave talks and wrote a speech for Butler. Gallagher implies this all led to Schema 13 supporting conscientious objectors and denouncing 'weapons of mass destruction'.

Authored works 
Zahn was the author of several books and articles, often focusing on the topics of conscience and war. He wrote Military Chaplains, based on interviews he did with RAF Chaplains who had served in the war. He then wrote German Catholics and Hitler's Wars, in which he argued priests had aided Hitler by telling Germans it was their religious duty to fight. He later wrote In Solitary Witness: The Life and Death of Franz Jägerstätter, about the Austrian conscientious objector who refused to fight in Hitler's army. He was also the co-founder of Pax Christi USA.

In 1968, he signed the "Writers and Editors War Tax Protest" pledge, vowing to refuse tax payments in protest against the Vietnam War.

In 1982 he received the Pax Christi award from St John's.

Books 
 Zahn, Gordon. German Catholics and Hitler's Wars: A Study in Social Control 1964. 
 Zahn, Gordon. In Solitary Witness: The Life and Death of Franz Jägerstätter 1964. 
 Zahn, Gordon. What is Society? 1964 Hawthorn Books.
 Zahn, Gordon. Another Part of the War: The Camp Simon Story 1979

References

External links 
Center on Conscience and War Records at the University of Notre Dame
Catholic Peace Fellowship Obit
Times Online Obit
Milwaukee Journal Sentinel Obit

1918 births
2007 deaths
Catholic University of America alumni
Loyola University Chicago faculty
University of Massachusetts Amherst faculty
American Christian pacifists
American conscientious objectors
American sociologists
20th-century American educators
American Roman Catholics
American tax resisters
Neurological disease deaths in Wisconsin
Deaths from Alzheimer's disease
Scientists from Milwaukee
Roman Catholic activists
Writers from Milwaukee
Members of the Civilian Public Service
20th-century American non-fiction writers
Catholic pacifists
Roman Catholic scholars